Perito Moreno Airport  is an airport serving Perito Moreno, a town in the Santa Cruz Province of Argentina.

The Perito Moreno non-directional beacon (Ident: PTM) is located on the field.

Airlines and destinations 
No scheduled flights operate at this airport.

See also

Transport in Argentina
List of airports in Argentina

References

External links
OpenStreetMap - Aeropuerto Jalil Hamer
FallingRain - Perito Moreno Airport

Airports in Argentina